A Renaissance fair, Renaissance faire or Renaissance festival is an outdoor gathering that aims to recreate a historical setting—most often the English Renaissance—for the amusement of its guests. Renaissance fairs generally include an abundance of costumed entertainers or fair-goers, musical and theatrical acts, art and handicrafts for sale, and festival food. These fairs are open to the public and typically commercial in nature; some are permanent theme parks, while others are short-term events in a fairground, winery, or other large public or private spaces. Some offer campgrounds for those who wish to stay more than one day.

Many Renaissance fairs are set during the reign of Queen Elizabeth I of England. Some are set earlier, during the reign of Henry VIII, or in other countries, such as France, some are set outside the era of the Renaissance; these may include earlier medieval periods (including Vikings), or later periods, such as 17th- or 18th-century pirates. Some engage in deliberate "time travel" by encouraging participants to wear costumes representing several eras in a broad time period. Renaissance fairs encourage visitors to enter into the spirit of things with costumes and audience participation. Many welcome fantasy elements such as wizards and elves.

Characteristics

Most Renaissance fairs are arranged to represent an imagined village in England during the reign of Elizabeth I, as this period has been generally considered to correspond to the flowering of the English Renaissance.

In a modern Renaissance festival, there are stages or performance areas set up for scheduled shows, such as plays in Shakespearean or commedia dell'arte tradition, as well as anachronistic audience participation comedy routines. Other performances include dancers, magicians, musicians, jugglers, and singers. Between the stages, the streets ("lanes") are lined with stores ("shoppes") and stalls where independent vendors sell medieval and Renaissance-themed handcrafts, clothing, books, and artworks. There are food and beverage vendors, as well as game and ride areas.

Renaissance fairs typically feature a wide variety of foods inspired by both Medieval cuisine and typical American fair foods like corn dogs. Some foods like turkey legs, steak on a stick and bread bowls have become iconic of renaissance festivals. Beer, mead, and wine are also sometimes present.

Games include basic skills events, such as archery or axe-throwing, as well as Drench-a-Wench and Soak-a-Bloke, which allow a player with a good aim to hit a target and get a fair employee wet. Rides are typically not machine-powered; various animal rides and human-powered swings are common. Live animal displays and falconry exhibitions are also commonplace. Larger Renaissance fairs will often include a joust as a main attraction. PETA and Born Free USA have protested the use of elephants and camels at the Maryland Renaissance Festival and Arizona Renaissance Festival.

In addition to the staged performances, a major attraction of Renaissance fairs is the crowds of actors—both professional and amateur—who play historical figures and roam the fair, interacting with visitors. Visitors are encouraged to wear costumes, contributing to the illusion of an actual Renaissance environment. Some allow weapons that are suitably peace-bonded, while others only allow fair employees to wear them. Many of the fair vendors sell or rent costumes for all ages and types. The Renaissance fair subculture's word for these costumed guests is "playtrons," a portmanteau of the words "player" and "patron." They add a second level of enjoyment to their experience by "getting into the act" as Renaissance Lords and Ladies, peasants, pirates, belly dancers, or fantasy characters. However, many Renaissance fairs discourage interaction between the official cast and so-called "playtrons."

Most fairs have an end-of-the-day ritual, a parade, dance or concert where all employees gather and bid farewell to the patrons.

Renaissance fairs are staged around the world at different times of the year. Fair vendors, participants, and crew often work the "fair circuit," going from event to event as one fair ends and another begins.

History in the United States

In post–World War II America, there was a resurgence of interest in medieval and Renaissance culture. In the 1950s, there was a very strong early music revival, and out of that came folk musician and traditionalist John Langstaff. In 1957, Langstaff held "A Christmas Masque of Traditional Revels" in New York City, and the following year another in Washington, D.C. A televised version was broadcast on the Hallmark Hall of Fame in 1966 which included Dustin Hoffman playing the part of the dragon slain by Saint George, and, in 1971, Langstaff established a permanent Christmas Revels in Cambridge, Massachusetts.

In 1963, Los Angeles schoolteacher Phyllis Patterson held a very small Renaissance fair as a class activity, in the backyard of her Laurel Canyon home in the Hollywood Hills. On May 11 and 12 of that year, Patterson and her husband, Ron Patterson, presented the first "Renaissance Pleasure Faire" as a one-weekend fundraiser for radio station KPFK which drew some 8,000 people. The fair was designed by the Living History Center to resemble an actual Spring market fair of the period.

Many of the original booths were no-charge reenactments of historical activities, including printing presses and blacksmiths. The first commercial vendors were mostly artisans and food merchants and were required to demonstrate historical accuracy or plausibility for their wares. Groups of volunteers were organized into "guilds" to focus on specific reenactment duties (musicians, military, Celtic clans, peasants, etc.). Both actors and vendors were required to stay "in character" while working by speaking with period language, accents, and mannerisms.

The original Renaissance Pleasure Faire of Southern California (RPFS) was held in the Spring 1966 at the Paramount Ranch located in Agoura, California, focusing on the practices of old English springtime markets and "Maying" customs. In 1967, the Pattersons created a Fall Renaissance fair, with a harvest festival theme, first at what is now China Camp State Park in San Rafael, California, and, in 1971, at the Black Point Forest in Novato, California. Both fairs developed into local traditions and began a movement that spread across the country.

Although historical reenactments are by no means exclusive to the United States (for example, the Earl of Eglinton in Scotland sponsored a large tournament in 1839), the Renaissance fair is largely an American variation on the theme. European historical fairs, such as those held at Kentwell Hall in Suffolk, England, operate more on the living history museum model, in which an actual historic site is peopled by re-enactors whose job it is to explain historical life to modern visitors.

In recent years, American-style Renaissance fairs have made inroads in other countries. Germany has seen a very similar phenomenon since the 1980s (see :de:Mittelaltermarkt), and, beginning in the mid-1990s, Renaissance fairs have spread into Canada and Australia.
 
Spinoffs of Renaissance fairs also include fairs set in other time periods, such as Christmas fairs set in Charles Dickens' London.

Names
Renaissance fairs have several variant names, many of which use old-fashioned spellings such as faire or fayre. These spellings originate from the Middle English feire (variant spellings include feyre, faire, and fayre), which comes from the Anglo-French word feire. They can also be referred to as "Elizabethan", "Medieval", or "Tudor" fairs or festivals. "Ren Fair" and "Ren Fest" are popular colloquialisms. 

A German Mittelaltermarkt (literally "medieval market") is very similar to a Renaissance fair. Many Catalan towns hold Mercats Medievals (literally "medieval markets") as part of their annual festivities.

Internal debates
Within the Renaissance fair community, there is a difference of opinion as to how authentic a fair ought to be. Some believe fairs should be as authentic an experience as possible, supplemented with educational aspects as in European living history museums. Others believe that entertainment is the primary goal. Richard Shapiro, who founded what later became the Bristol Renaissance Faire outside Chicago in 1972, favored entertainment, saying "we were so authentic back then it was almost painful."

Renaissance fairs may try to bridge this apparent gap between authentic and entertaining. In 1968, Phyllis Patterson, founder of the California Renaissance Pleasure Faires, also created the Living History Centre, a California-based educational and cultural foundation. The foundation's motto "we trick into learning with a laugh" describes her philosophy of merging history and entertainment.

See also 
 List of Renaissance and Medieval fairs
 Medieval reenactment
 Renaissance Magazine
 Society for Creative Anachronism
 Texas Renaissance Festival

Notes

External links

 List of upcoming Renaissance Fairs (US)

 
Festivals in the United States
Historical reenactment events
History festivals by period